Dylan David Coleman (born September 16, 1996) is an American professional baseball pitcher for the Kansas City Royals of Major League Baseball (MLB). He made his MLB debut in 2021.

Amateur career
Coleman attended Potosi High School in Potosi, Missouri. Undrafted out of high school in 2015, he attended Missouri State University to play college baseball for the Bears. He played for the Bourne Braves of the Cape Cod League in 2017. Coleman produced his best collegiate season as a junior in 2018, going 10–2 with a 3.77 ERA and 129 strikeouts over  innings. Coleman was drafted by the San Diego Padres in the fourth round of the 2018 Major League Baseball draft.

Professional career

San Diego Padres
Coleman split his professional debut season of 2018 between the Tri-City Dust Devils and the Fort Wayne TinCaps, going 1–2 with a 3.18 ERA and 29 strikeouts over  innings. Coleman split the 2019 season between the AZL Padres, Fort Wayne, and the Lake Elsinore Storm, going a combined 4–3 with a 3.18 ERA and 39 strikeouts over 34 innings. Coleman did not play in 2020 due to the cancellation of the Minor League Baseball season because of the COVID-19 pandemic.

Kansas City Royals
On November 5, 2020, Coleman traded to the Kansas City Royals as a player to be named later from an earlier trade that sent Trevor Rosenthal to San Diego, and Edward Olivares to Kansas City. Coleman split the 2021 minor league season between the Northwest Arkansas Naturals and the Omaha Storm Chasers, going a combined 5–1 with a 3.28 ERA and 93 strikeouts over  innings. 

On September 21, 2021, Kansas City selected Coleman's contract to the active roster, and he made his MLB debut that night versus the Cleveland Indians.

References

External links

Missouri State Bears bio

1996 births
Living people
People from Potosi, Missouri
Baseball players from Missouri
Major League Baseball pitchers
Kansas City Royals players
Missouri State Bears baseball players
Bourne Braves players
Arizona League Padres players
Tri-City Dust Devils players
Fort Wayne TinCaps players
Lake Elsinore Storm players
Northwest Arkansas Naturals players
Omaha Storm Chasers players